Riddiford may refer to:

Antarctic landform:
 Riddiford Nunatak in the Churchill Mountains, Oates Land 

People:
 Charles Ernest Riddiford (18971968), Cartographer and typeface designer at National Geographic Society
 Dan Riddiford (19141974), New Zealand politician
 Edward Riddiford (18421911), New Zealand farmer and runholder, known as "King" Riddiford 
 Earle Riddiford (19211989), New Zealand lawyer and mountain climber 
 Lynn Riddiford (b. 1936), American entomologist and biologist